Susana Garabatos Rodríguez (born March 8, 1979 in Vigo, Pontevedra) is a former freestyle swimmer from Spain, who competed for her native country at the 1996 Summer Olympics in Atlanta, Georgia. There she was eliminated in the qualifying heats of the 4x100m Freestyle Relay, alongside Blanca Cerón, Fátima Madrid, and Claudia Franco

External links
 Spanish Olympic Committee

1979 births
Living people
Spanish female freestyle swimmers
Olympic swimmers of Spain
Swimmers at the 1996 Summer Olympics
20th-century Spanish women